75th may refer to:

75th Academy Awards honored the best films of 2002, held on March 23, 2003
75th Avenue–61st Street Historic District, a national historic district in Ridgewood, Queens, New York
75th Grey Cup, the 1987 Canadian Football League championship game that was played at BC Place Stadium in Vancouver
75th meridian east, a line of longitude
75th meridian west, a line of longitude
75th parallel north, a circle of latitude that is 75 degrees north of the Earth's equatorial plane
75th parallel south, a circle of latitude that is 75 degrees south of the Earth's equatorial plane
75th Police Precinct Station House, a historic police station located at Brooklyn in New York, New York

Military units
75th Air Base Wing, a unit of the United States Air Force
75th Battalion (Mississauga), CEF a unit of the Canadian Expeditionary Force
75th Brigade (disambiguation), several units
75th Division (disambiguation), several units
75th Regiment (disambiguation), several units
75th Squadron (disambiguation), several units

Politics
75th Delaware General Assembly, a meeting of the legislative branch of the state government
75th Oregon Legislative Assembly, convened beginning on January 12, 2009, for its biennial regular session
75th United States Congress, a meeting of the legislative branch of the United States federal government
Virginia's 75th House of Delegates district, a political district for representation in Virginia's lower house

Public transport
75th Avenue (IND Queens Boulevard Line), a local station of the New York City Subway 
75th Street–Elderts Lane (BMT Jamaica Line), a skip-stop station of the New York City Subway
75th Street (Grand Crossing) station, an electrified commuter rail station along the Metra Electric Main Line in Chicago, Illinois

See also
Ankara 75th Anniversary Race Course, a horse racing track at Batıkent neighborhood in Yenimahalle district of Ankara, Turkey
California's 75th State Assembly district, one of 80 districts in the California State Assembly
CMLL 75th Anniversary Show, a professional wrestling major show event produced in 2008 in Arena Mexico, Mexico City, Mexico
Maserati Birdcage 75th, a concept car created by automobile manufacturer Maserati
National Football League 75th Anniversary All-Time Team, chosen by a selection committee of media and league personnel in 1994
75 (number)
AD 75, the year 75 (LXXV) of the Julian calendar
75 BC